DragonHeart: Fire and Steel is a video game loosely based on the 1996 fantasy adventure film Dragonheart. On most systems it is a 2D side-scrolling action game, but the Game Boy version is an adventure game with combat scenes, where adventure mode uses a first-person view and combat mode is a simple 2D fighting game.

Plot
DragonHeart: Fire and Steel follows the story of medieval dragonslayer Sir Bowen in his attempt to rid the world of a particularly evil king along with seven evil dragons that have ruled the world (the seven evil dragons never appeared in the movie). On the way, he befriends the last dragon to exist, Draco. Sir Bowen and Draco must join forces to defeat the king's army and rescue a damsel in distress. It drops out some of the movie's plot, but it is still a close match.

Reception

After its release, Dragonheart spawned a spin-off 2D hack and slash game for the PlayStation and Saturn called Dragonheart: Fire & Steel, made by Acclaim Entertainment. The game does not use the film's music, instead featuring an original score by Thomas Egeskov Peterson. It was met with overwhelmingly negative reviews due to simplistic gameplay, poor controls, and jerky animation. Though the graphics were praised, particularly the rendered backgrounds, critics agreed that the gameplay problems were an overriding problem. In late 1996, Acclaim ported a PC version of the game, which received similar criticism.

There was also an original Game Boy game based on the film, titled simply Dragonheart. The four reviewers of Electronic Gaming Monthly, while remarking that the Game Boy game is rather simple and lacking in challenge, especially the "anticlimactic" combat, concluded that it offers decent entertainment and longevity for a portable game. They especially praised the storyline, with Sushi X going so far as to say it was the main reason he kept playing the game.

Reviews
 GameFan #50 (vol. 5, issue #2) - February 1997
 PC Games (Germany) - January 1997
 PC Player (Germany) - January 1997

References

External links
 DragonHeart: Fire and Steel on Mobygames

1996 video games
Acclaim Entertainment games
Action video games
Funcom games
Game Boy games
Hack and slash games
Platform games
PlayStation (console) games
Sega Saturn games
Single-player video games
Torus Games games
Video games based on films
Video games developed in Australia
Video games developed in Norway
Video games with digitized sprites
Windows games